Deeveyidae is a family of ostracods belonging to the order Halocyprida.

Genera:
 Deeveya Kornicker & Iliffe, 1985
 Spelaeoecia Angel & Iliffe, 1987

References

Ostracods